The principal sports in Namibia are football, rugby union, cricket, golf and fishing. Boxing and athletics are also popular. The home stadium for all national teams is Independence Stadium in Windhoek, while Sam Nujoma Stadium in Katutura is also occasionally used.

Football 

Football in Namibia is governed by the Namibia Football Association. The Namibia Premier League is the main domestic league. The Namibia national football team has never qualified for the FIFA World Cup, but has twice been runner up in the COSAFA Cup. They have qualified for two African Cups of Nations, in 1998 and 2008, where they lost in the first round.

Rugby union 

 
Rugby union was introduced to Namibia from South Africa in 1916. The main governing body today is the Namibia Rugby Union.

The Namibian national team are commonly known as the Welwitschia. Namibia has made the World Cup on six occasions, in 1999, 2003, 2007, 2011, 2015, and 2019 but has never won a game.

Until independence, players for Namibia were also eligible to represent South Africa with Namibian born Springboks including Jan Ellis and, more recently, Percy Montgomery. Various players pursue their rugby careers in South Africa and in a number of European countries.

Cricket  

The history of cricket in Namibia is closely linked with South African cricket. After independence, the newly formed Namibian Cricket Board set about developing the game throughout the country, and also arranged visits from various English county teams and The Netherlands. They were granted associate membership of the ICC in 1992. Namibia played six matches in the 2003 World Cup and lost all of them. However they had a credible match against England where they were ahead of the English under the Duckworth-Lewis method for twelve overs and Jan Berrie Burger almost mastered an upset with 85 off 86 balls. Rudi van Vuuren took 5 wickets, and later went on to feature in the Rugby World Cup for Namibia that same year.

Namibia qualified for the ICC World T20 in UAE and Oman in 2021 where the team won its first ever world cup match against Netherlands followed by victory against Ireland to qualify for Super 12s. The victory against Ireland was the first ever win by Namibia against a Full member in a official international match. In the T20 World Cup 2022 in Australia, Namibia registered their most famous victory by beating Sri Lanka by 55 runs at Geelong. However, they could not the repeat the feat of the 2021 T20 World cup as they lost their next two matches to Netherlands and UAE. 

Former South African all-rounder David Wiese is Namibia's most high profile cricketer and is a regular in various T20 Leagues, most notably in Pakistan Super League where he plays for Lahore Qalandars. In the recently concluded IPL 2023 Auctions, David Wiese was picked by Kolkata Knight Riders.

World Cup 
1975 to 1992 inclusive: Not eligible - Not an ICC member
1996: Did not qualify
1999: Did not qualify
2003: First round
2007: Did not qualify
 T20 World Cup 2021 : Super 12

Development Programs 
Except for a few cases, cricket in Namibia has been confined to the Afrikaans and German speaking populations, with the indigenous Africans who constitute 80% of the national population showing hardly any interest.

Athletics 
The most prominent Namibian athlete, and one of the most prominent people in general, is the former sprinter Frankie Fredericks. He is the first  Olympic medalist from the country, and won four Olympic silver medals in total. He also became world champion in 1993 and won an additional three silver medal at the World Championships, all in the 200 metres event. He holds the African record in this event with 19.68 seconds, and held the African record in 100 metres until May 2006.

Sprinters Christine Mboma and Beatrice Masilingi attended the 2020 Tokyo Olympics. Although disallowed from their favourite 400 metres event due to naturally high testosterone levels, they both ran the 200 metres and qualified for the final, the first female Namibian athletes to do so at the Olympics. Christine Mboma won a silver at Tokyo Olympics 2020 in women's 200m.

Other prominent athletes include middle distance runner Agnes Samaria and long-distance runner Luketz Swartbooi, as well as paralympic athletes Johanna Benson, Ananias Shikongo, Johannes Nambala, and Reginald Benade.

Basketball 
 
Namibia waits for its first qualification for the FIBA Africa Championship. Its basketball federation cooperates with the German federation.

Boxing  
There have been several successful Namibian boxers, including Japhet Uutoni (winner of gold medal at 2006 Commonwealth Games and 2006 African Boxing championships), Paulus Ambunda (represented his country at the 2004 Summer Olympics in Athens), Paulus Moses, Harry Simon and Joseph Jermia (represented his country at the 2004 Summer Olympics as well as winning a bronze medal in the 48 kg weight class in the 2003 All-Africa Games. In March 2008, Namibia hosted  the final round of qualifying for the continental tournament of boxing at the 2008 Summer Olympics. As Japhet Uutoni had already qualified for the 2008 Olympics by winning his class in the first round of qualifiers, 2 other Namibian boxers also qualified (Mujandjae Kasuto and Julius Indongo). In January 2009, Paulus Moses defeated Yusuke Kobori of Japan to win the WBA lightweight title.

Golf 

The most prominent Namibian golfer is Trevor Dodds.

There are 25 :

 Tsumeb Golf Club
 Henties Bay Golf & Lifestyle Estate
 Rossmund Desert Golf Course, Swakopmund
 Walvis Bay Golf Course
 Omeya Golf Club, between Windhoek and Rehoboth
 Windhoek Country Club Resort Golf Course
 Gobabis Golf Course
 Keetmanshoop Golf Course
 Lüderitz Golf Course
 Oranjemund Golf Club

Horse Riding

Namibian Equestrian Riding 
The Namibian Equestrian Federation (NAMEF) was founded in 1958 by Mr. E Homan, E. Holtz and I. Voigts. It was originally known as the South West African Horse Society and changed its name to NAMEF after Namibia gained independence from the Republic of South Africa. They are affiliated to the Namibian Sport Commission (NSC), the Namibian National Olympic Committee (NNOC) and the International body Federation Equestrian International (FEI) since 1992, representing the horse sport on a National and International level.

Namibian Endurance Riding 
Namibia Endurance Ride Association (NERA) is the official association for endurance riding in Namibia. NERA holds regular endurance competitions and rides throughout the country.

Icestock in Namibia 
The Icestocksport Association of Namibia was founded in 2004. The men's team won the Africa Cup on 6 occasion (2005, 2007, 2009, 2015, 2017, 2019). The ladies' team won the Africa Cup in 2013 and 2017. In 2020 the men's team won the silver medal at the World Championship in group B.

Lawn Bowls in Namibia 
Lawn bowls was one of the first sport codes in Namibia to produce a world champion. Douw Calitz was the winner of this title when he emerged victor of the World Champion of Champions tournament in 2003 in Moama, Australia. Some of the major national tournaments include the annual National League, as well as the annual Namibia National Championships. In 2013, Namibia played host to the African States Tournament, a competition featuring seven countries from all over Africa. The National men's side is currently ranked 11th in the world.

Sailing 
The Namibia Sailing Association is the national governing body for the sport of sailing in Namibia, serving at the discretion of the Namibian Sports Commission and recognised by World Sailing.

The following are affiliated members:

 Walvis Bay Yacht Club
 Namib Kite & Windsurf Club
 Luderitz Yacht Club
 Nomad Sailing Club Windhoek
 Skeleton Coast Surf Club

References